The 2022 Turkish Cup Final was a football match that decided the winner of the 2021–22 Turkish Cup, the 60th edition of Turkey's primary football cup. The match was played on 26 May 2022 at the Atatürk Olympic Stadium in Istanbul between Kayserispor and Sivasspor.

Sivasspor won 3–2 after extra time for their first Turkish Cup title.

Route to the final

Key: (H) = Home; (A) = Away

Match

Details

Notes

References

2022
Cup
Sivasspor matches
Kayserispor matches